Thazata (also known as Ali Shah; 1464–1521) was king of Arakan from 1515 to 1521. He was a son of King Dawlya (r. 1482–1492), and governor of Ramree when he was selected by the ministers to succeed King Saw O. He moved the palace from Mrauk-U to a place called Daingkyi. He died in 1521.

He built the Andaw-thein Ordination Hall.

References

Bibliography
 
 

Monarchs of Mrauk-U
1464 births
1521 deaths
15th century in Burma
16th century in the Mrauk-U Kingdom
16th-century Burmese monarchs